Médéric Clain (born 29 October 1976 in Meulan-en-Yvelines) is a French cyclist riding for UV Poitiers.

Major results

1999
1st Tour de Corrèze
2000
2nd GP Ostfenster
2003
2nd Tallinn-Tartu GP
2005
1st stage 1 Critérium des Espoirs
2nd Circuit de Saône-et-Loire
2nd Circuit Boussaquin
2nd Grand Prix de la Ville de Nogent-sur-Oise
2006
3rd Grand Prix de la Ville de Lillers
3rd Boucle de l'Artois
3rd Tour de Moselle
2007
1st Grand Prix de Tours
1st stage 1 Tour de Dordogne
3rd Grand Prix Cristal Energie
2008
1st stage 2 Tour du Canton de Saint-Ciers
2009
1st stage 4 Tour de Nouvelle-Calédonie
2nd La Roue Tourangelle
2nd Ronde de l'Oise
2010
1st Grand Prix de Tours
2nd Tour de Madagascar
1st Stages 4 & 10
2011
1st stages 1b & 5 Boucle du Coton
3rd Tour de Madagascar
1st Prologue (TTT) & Stage 1

References

1976 births
Living people
French male cyclists